The Serbian Blue Book is a collection of 52 Serbian diplomatic documents regarding events between 29 June and 6 August 1914, a period including the aftermath of the assassination of Archduke Ferdinand (the July Crisis) and the beginning of World War I, published by the Government of the Kingdom of Serbia on 18 November 1914. It includes correspondence between Serbian ministers and diplomats, Serbia and Russia (including royal), Austria-Hungary, and Germany. It was published in French translation in 1914, and English translation by the British Foreign Office in Collected Diplomatic Documents Relating to the Outbreak of the European War, and also American Association for International Conciliation, in 1915.

After the war, the Allied Commission used the book along with other diplomatic document collections to conclude the responsibility of the Central Powers in the war. According to Joseph Ward Swain, the 'purpose of the Serbian blue book was to show the aggressive spirit of the Austrians'.

See also
Serbian Campaign of World War I
Austro-Hungarian Red Book
Belgian Grey Book
Color books
French Yellow Book
German White Book
British Blue Book
Russian Orange Book

References

Sources

1914 non-fiction books
1914 in Serbia
Serbian diplomats
Serbia in World War I
Serbian books
World War I books
World War I documents
Politics of World War I
Austria-Hungary–Serbia relations
Politics of the Kingdom of Serbia
1914 documents